Oceana Mahlmann (born January 23, 1982) is a German singer. Her musical roots are embedded in soul, reggae, hip hop, and funk.

Biography
Oceana was raised by her mother, a German Haute Couture designer.  Her father was a DJ from Martinique. The funk legend Maceo Parker is a close family friend and as a young child she performed with him on stage.

In her teens, she established herself as dancer and choreographer. She performed in the role of Aida in the musical Aida by Tim Rice and Elton John. She was also the vocal soloist in the musical version of Dirty Dancing by Eleanor Bergstein. In 2006, she was the choreographer of the German chart-breaking band Seeed.

In 2008, she signed to Warner to establish herself as a singer-songwriter.

Her solo career took off in 2009 with the release of the single "Cry Cry" from her debut album Love Supply, which was also released on the US-market by the label Ultra Records. This was a breakthrough in her career: the song was the highest selling single in Poland that year and peaked in several other European countries in the charts.  Following this success Oceana appeared in numerous European TV shows.

In March 2010, she appeared in the Polish version of Dancing with the Stars, but she withdrew, because she was in an advanced state of pregnancy and she finished in 6th place. In May 2010, she hosted the TV show Arte Lounge, which aired on the acclaimed European channel Arte.  She has also appeared as a musical guest on the Greek X Factor and performed on some of the greatest festivals in Europe. On her tour for Love Supply, she performed festivals such as Rock En Seine in France and the Sopot International Song Festival in Poland. Throughout her career, she has supported musicians such as Lionel Richie, Raphael Saadiq, and Annie Lennox.

Due to her success the Union of European Football Associations (UEFA) chose her to follow Nelly Furtado (2004) and Enrique Iglesias (2008) to write and perform the official 2012 UEFA song "Endless Summer" for the UEFA European Football Championship, one of the biggest sports events in the world. At the closing ceremony on July 1, 2012 Oceana performed the song live to a television audience of approximately one billion people. The video of Endless Summer" has been watched by more than 80 million people. The song received numerous gold and platinum awards throughout Europe (Germany, Poland, Russia, Ukraine, and Italy).

Her second album, My House, was released in Europe on July 22, 2012.

Oceana is working on her third album in Los Angeles, which was scheduled for release in late 2014 or 2015. After long anticipation, her third studio album "Can't Stop Thinking About You" was released in 2018.

Discography

Albums

Singles

References

German soul singers
English-language singers from Germany
Living people
1982 births
Participants in the Bundesvision Song Contest
People from Wedel
Dancing with the Stars: Taniec z gwiazdami
German people of Martiniquais descent
21st-century German women singers